Dunedin Suburbs is a former parliamentary electorate in the city of Dunedin in Otago, New Zealand from  to 1893. The electorate was represented by one Member of Parliament, William Dawson, representing the Liberal Party.

Population centres
In December 1887, the House of Representatives voted to reduce its membership from general electorates from 91 to 70. The 1890 electoral redistribution used the same 1886 census data used for the 1887 electoral redistribution. In addition, three-member electorates were introduced in the four main centres. It covered the area north, west and south of the  electorate, including North East Valley, Leith Valley, and South Dunedin. Dunedin Suburbs incorporated the vast majority of the former  electorate.

In the 1892 electoral redistribution, the Dunedin Suburbs electorate was abolished again. Its southern area mostly went to the City of Dunedin electorate, and some areas went to the  electorate. Northern and eastern areas were taken into the new  electorate, and small areas went to the new  electorate.

History
The 1890 election was contested by William Dawson, Archibald Hilson Ross, and Francis Wilkinson. Dawson had previously been Mayor of Dunedin (1887–1888). Ross was the incumbent from the  electorate, and had been Mayor of Dunedin in 1880–1881. Dawson won the election by a large majority.

At the end of the parliamentary term in 1893, the Dunedin Suburbs electorate was abolished.

Members of Parliament

Election results

1890 election

Notes

References

Historical electorates of New Zealand
Politics of Dunedin
1890 establishments in New Zealand
1893 disestablishments in New Zealand